Chuck Berry Is on Top is the third studio album by rock and roll artist Chuck Berry, released in July 1959 on Chess Records, catalogue LP 1435. With the exception of one track, "Blues for Hawaiians," all selections had been previously released on 45 rpm singles, several of which were double-sided and charted twice. In his review of the album for AllMusic, Cub Koda described it as "almost a mini-greatest-hits package in and of itself" and the most perfectly realized collection of Berry's career. In 2008, Mobile Fidelity Sound Lab reissued the album with St. Louis to Liverpool on an Ultradisc II Gold compact disc. In 2012, Hoodoo reissued the album with One Dozen Berrys on the same CD.

Track listing

Personnel
 Chuck Berry – vocals, guitars 
 Johnnie Johnson, Lafayette Leake – piano
 Willie Dixon – double bass
 George Smith – bass
 Fred Below, Ebbie Hardy, Jaspar Thomas – drums
 Jerome Green – maracas
 The Moonglows – backing vocals
 Bob Bushnell –  bass on "Around and Around"

Charting history

Singles - Billboard (United States)

References

External links 

Chuck Berry compilation albums
1959 compilation albums
Chess Records compilation albums
Albums produced by Leonard Chess
Albums produced by Phil Chess